Congregation Achduth Vesholom is a Reform synagogue, located at 5200 Old Mill Road in Fort Wayne, Indiana.

It is the oldest synagogue in Indiana, having been formed initially as a German Orthodox congregation on October 26, 1848.  Originally, its name was "The Society for Visiting the Sick and Burying the Dead".  At the outset, the congregation worshiped in private homes.

In 1857, the synagogue purchased a building on Harrison Street for $1,200 ($ today), which was dedicated as a synagogue.   The first rabbi was Joseph Solomon, who served until 1859. In 1861, the congregation adopted its current name, which means "Unity and Peace".

The congregation built a Gothic-style temple with seating for 800 people in 1874 at the cost of $25,000 ($ today). Samuel Hirshberg was rabbi from 1891 to 1895.

The congregation moved to 5200 Old Mill Road in 1961.  In 1995, the synagogue hired a new rabbi, Sandford Kopnick.

References

External links
Congregation Achduth Vesholom homepage
Congregation Achduth Vesholom minute book 1876–83, Fort Wayne, Indiana, Achduth Vesholom Congregation (Fort Wayne, Ind.), 1876
One hundredth anniversary of Congregation Achduth Vesholom, 1848–1948, Achduth Vesholom Congregation (Fort Wayne, Ind.), The Temple, 1948
Congregation Achduth Vesholom, 150th anniversary celebration weekend: October 16–18, 1998, Beth Zweig, SRS Publications, 1998
Congregation Achduth Vesholom: our story, Beth Zweig, Achduth Vesholom, 2002
Achduth Vesholom Congregation of Fort Wayne, Indiana, Minutes, Achduth Vesholom Congregation (Fort Wayne), reprint, Nabu Press, 2010

German-American culture in Indiana
German-Jewish culture in the United States
Reform synagogues in Indiana
Synagogues in Indiana
Synagogues completed in 1874
Buildings and structures in Fort Wayne, Indiana
Culture of Fort Wayne, Indiana
1848 establishments in Indiana
Religious organizations established in 1848
Synagogues completed in 1961